Peter Richman may refer to:

 Peter Mark Richman, American actor
Peter Richman (MP) for Lyme Regis